The 2016 Grote Prijs Jef Scherens was the 50th edition of the Grote Prijs Jef Scherens cycle race and was held on 21 August 2016. The race started and finished in Leuven. The race was won by Dimitri Claeys.

General classification

References

2016
2016 in road cycling
2016 in Belgian sport